Rabbi Yaakov Zechariah Maskalik, known publicly as Reb Yankel Zhuravitzer (1897–1938) was an underground Chabad-Lubavitch activist in the early years of the Joseph Stalin regime. In defiance of the Soviet authorities, Reb Yankel compiled locations of usable mikvahs across the Soviet Union and distributed them in little notes to Jewish women in marketplaces. Additionally, he informed the sixth Chabad Rebbe Yosef Yitzchak Schneersohn of his activities. In praise of Reb Yankel, the Rebbe said, "If I had twenty Yankels, I could overturn all of Russia" In the early 1930s, he resided in the Moscow suburb of Malakhovka until his arrest in 1935.

Like many Chabad activist arrested by the authorities, he was deported to Central Asia, exiled to the village of Halkina, located 35 miles from the Kazakh city of Chimkent.

Reb Yankel was arrested by the NKVD in 1935 and executed in 1938. The exact date and location of his execution is not known.

References

Soviet dissidents
Russian Orthodox Jews
Russian people who died in prison custody
Prisoners who died in Soviet detention
Jews executed by the Soviet Union